Cerrillos is a city in the province of Salta, Argentina. It is located just 15 km south of the city of Salta, capital of the province.

Climate

References

 

Populated places in Salta Province